Borneomma is a genus of Indonesian araneomorph spiders in the family Tetrablemmidae that was first described by Christa Laetitia Deeleman-Reinhold in 1980.  it contains two species, found on Borneo: B. roberti and B. yuata.

See also
 List of Tetrablemmidae species

References

Araneomorphae genera
Spiders of Asia
Tetrablemmidae